Plouisy is a commune in the Côtes-d'Armor department of Brittany in north-western France. Plouisy is 407 kilometres from Paris.

Geography

Climate
Plouisy has a oceanic climate (Köppen climate classification Cfb).

Population

Inhabitants of Plouisy are called plouisyens in French.

See also
Communes of the Côtes-d'Armor department

References

External links

Communes of Côtes-d'Armor